The North Western Reporter and North Western Reporter, Second Series are United States regional case law reporters.  It is part of the National Reporter System created by John B. West for West Publishing Company, which is now part of Thomson West.

The North Western Reporter contains published appellate court case decisions for:
 Iowa
 Michigan
 Minnesota
 Nebraska
 North Dakota
 South Dakota
 Wisconsin

When cited, North Western Reporter and North Western Reporter, Second Series are abbreviated "N.W." and "N.W.2d", respectively.

References

National Reporter System